Jean-Baptiste Etcheverry (4 November 1805, Saint-Étienne-de-Baïgorry, Basses-Pyrénées – 4 March 1874, Paris), was a French politician.

In the house, he voted for the re-establishment of the Empire and agreed with all opinions of the majority.

He was successively reelected on June 22, 1857 and June 1, 1863, with large proportions of votes.

He retired from political life in 1869.

The cartoonist A-10 Etcheverry is his grandson.

References

Bibliography 
 

Members of the 1st Corps législatif of the Second French Empire
Members of the 2nd Corps législatif of the Second French Empire
Members of the 3rd Corps législatif of the Second French Empire
French general councillors
1805 births
1874 deaths
People from Lower Navarre
Politicians from Nouvelle-Aquitaine